Szymbark is a village in the administrative district of Gmina Gorlice, within Gorlice County, Lesser Poland Voivodeship, in southern Poland.

The village has a population of 3,067.

In Middle Ages the Szymbark Castle was residence of several knight families: Gładysz, Stroński, Siedlecki, Bronikowski, Rogoyski, Sękiewicz, and Kuźniarski.

See also
 Walddeutsche

References

Villages in Gorlice County